Vitznyssus is a genus of mites in the family Rhinonyssidae. There are about eight described species in Vitznyssus.

Species
These eight species belong to the genus Vitznyssus:
 Vitznyssus afrotis (Fain, 1966)
 Vitznyssus caprimulgi (Fain, 1957)
 Vitznyssus erici Knee, 2018
 Vitznyssus neotis (Fain, 1957)
 Vitznyssus scotornis (Fain, 1956)
 Vitznyssus tetragis Butenko, 1969
 Vitznyssus tsachevi Dimov & Rojas, 2012
 Vitznyssus vitzthumi (Fain, 1957)

References

Arachnids